Simon Richter (born 16 January 1985) is a Danish-born Gambian professional football defender, who plays for Tårnby FF. He also represented the Gambia national team.

International career
Richter debuted for the Gambia national football team in a friendly 2-1 win over the Central African Republic on 27 March 2017.

Personal life
He is the son of a Gambian father and a Danish mother and the twin brother of Jonathan Richter.

References

External links
Brønshøj Boldklub profile

Official Danish Superliga stats

1985 births
Living people
People with acquired Gambian citizenship
Gambian footballers
The Gambia international footballers
Danish men's footballers
Danish people of Gambian descent
Association football defenders
FC Nordsjælland players
Akademisk Boldklub players
HB Køge players
Danish Superliga players
Identical twins
Danish twins
Twin sportspeople
Fremad Amager players
Brønshøj Boldklub players
FC Roskilde players
Brøndby IF players
Tårnby FF players
Denmark Series players